Robert Nemcsics is a Slovak politician. He served as a deputy prime minister, Minister of Economy and acting Minister of Privatization. He has experience with high management because before he entered politics he was a manager in several important Slovak companies.

More information 
 http://www.government.gov.sk/english/minister_mh_nemcsics.html
 http://www.leaders.sk/index.php?id=814

References 

1961 births
Living people
People from Trenčianske Teplice
Government ministers of Slovakia
Idea (political party) politicians
Members of the National Council (Slovakia) 2002-2006